François Haas (16 October 1907 – 6 May 1996) was a French racing cyclist. He rode in the 1932 Tour de France.

References

1907 births
1996 deaths
French male cyclists
Place of birth missing